Wykey is a hamlet in Shropshire, England.

It is approximately 2 miles north of the larger village of Ruyton-XI-Towns, and is recognised as one of the eleven ("XI") towns.

In the centre of the village one can find the rare sight of a 19th-century, Victorian red postbox and red telephone box, which amount to its only facilities.

See also
Listed buildings in Ruyton-XI-Towns

External links

Villages in Shropshire